"Bitte bitte" ("Bitte, bitte" on CD) ["Please please"] is a song by German band Die Ärzte. It is the eleventh track and the third single from their 1988 album Das ist nicht die ganze Wahrheit.... The song focuses on a desire to obey a dominatrix.

The Domina Mix was later released on "Das Beste von kurz nach früher bis jetze". The song was covered by the German band Tanzwut on their Labyrinth der Sinne album and was released as a single. The song was also covered by German band Eisbrecher on their Shicksalsmelodien album.

Video 
The video centers on a dystopia-like censoring facility (resemblant of a factory), which is ruled by a dominatrix. As for the products censored, everything appears to be running smoothly until Ärzte-LPs start to be censored,  as they will not go into a monstrous machine like they are intended to.

Track listing 
 "Bitte bitte" (Urlaub) - 3:13
 "Gabi gibt 'ne Party" (Urlaub, Felsenheimer) - 3:10

Maxi
 "Bitte bitte (Domina Mix)" (Urlaub) - 7:35
 "Bitte bitte (Single Version)" (Urlaub) - 3:13
 "Bitte bitte (CBS Mix)" (Urlaub) - 6:06
 "Gabi gibt 'ne Party" (Urlaub, Felsenheimer) - 3:10

Personnel
Farin Urlaub - vocals, guitar, bass, synthesizer
Bela B. - drums

B-sides
"Gabi gibt 'ne Party" [Gabi throws a party] is another song from Gabi & Uwe series. It was later released on "Das Beste von kurz nach früher bis jetze".

Charts

Weekly charts

Year-end charts

References

1989 singles
Die Ärzte songs
Songs written by Farin Urlaub
1988 songs
Songs about BDSM
German-language songs
CBS Records singles